Burhan Nizam Shah II (ruled 1591–1595) was the ruler of Ahmadnagar Sultanate in the Deccan. He was the second son of Hussain Nizam Shah I and Khunza Humayun Begum. During his reign, he ruled from the capital city of Ahmednagar.

Burhan Nizam Shah's rule was short, as he was a weak and incapable monarch. He was addicted to women and wine, which ultimately led to his fall.

His death in 1595 was followed by a civil war over who should rule. He was eventually succeeded in actual power by his sister Chand Bibi, who ruled in the name of his infant son.

Sources
John F. Richards. The New Cambridge History of India: The Mughals. New York: Cambridge University Press, 1993. p. 51.

1595 deaths
Ahmadnagar Sultanate
Year of birth unknown